The Petroglyph Point is an archaeological site within the Lava Beds National Monument, located southeast of Tulelake, California. Petroglyph Point contains one of the largest panels of Native American rock art in the United States. The petroglyphs are carved along the face of a former island of ancient Tule Lake, in a region historically of the Modoc people territory. The Petroglyph Point Archeological Site was listed on the National Register of Historic Places in 1975, while the Lava Beds National Monument Archeological District was listed in March 1991.

Because of the number of times the petroglyphs may have been inundated in water as Tule Lake rose and fell around the cliff face, the age of the individual petroglyphs is complicated to calculate based on weathering. Most estimates date these carvings back between 2000 and 6000 years ago.

Unlike rock art in other areas of the West, many of the images seem to be mostly geometric patterns instead of depictions of people and animals. Because of the tribal fracturing produced during the Modoc War and most of the Native Americans from the region having long since moved into other areas, no ethnographic study was ever done with Modoc peoples to record the probable meaning of the petroglyphs.

See also 
National Register of Historic Places listings in Modoc County, California

References

External links 

National Register of Historic Places in Lava Beds National Monument
Archaeological sites in California
Landforms of Siskiyou County, California
Petroglyphs in California
Modoc tribe
Native American history of California